James McLaughlin  (born 2 October 1990) is a Guernsey former road racing cyclist. He has been successful at Island Games and continental levels, also competing in the Commonwealth Games representing Guernsey.

McLaughlin placed 10th at the Commonwealth Games Time Trial in 2014 making him the highest placed rider not competing for a WorldTour team and earning him a professional contract with  the following year.

Major results

2008
 2nd Time trial, National Junior Road Championships
2011
 Island Games
2nd  Time trial
2nd  Road race
 5th Overall Cinturón a Mallorca
2014
 5th Time trial, National Road Championships
 10th Time trial, Commonwealth Games
2015
 10th Chrono des Nations
 10th Chrono Champenois
2016
 4th GP Kranj
2018
 6th Time trial, Commonwealth Games

References

External links

1990 births
Living people
Guernsey male cyclists
Cyclists at the 2010 Commonwealth Games
Cyclists at the 2014 Commonwealth Games
Cyclists at the 2018 Commonwealth Games
Commonwealth Games competitors for Guernsey